ISO 25119, titled "Tractors and machinery for agriculture and forestry – Safety-related parts of control systems",  is an international standard for functional safety of electrical and/or electronic systems that are installed in tractors and machines used in agriculture and forestry, defined by the International Organization for Standardization (ISO).

Parts of ISO 25119
ISO 25119 consists of following parts:
 General principles for design and development
 Concept phase
 Series development, hardware and software
 Production, operation, modification and supporting processes

See also 
 IEC 61508

References

25119
International standards
Safety engineering